Douglas Durst (born December 19, 1944) is an American real estate investor and developer. He is the president of the Durst Organization, which he has been in charge of since 1992.

Early life and education
Durst was born in New York City in 1944 to a Jewish family, the son of Bernice (née Herstein) and Seymour Durst. He is the younger brother of Robert Durst.

Durst's paternal grandfather, Joseph Durst, a penniless immigrant tailor from Austria Hungary, eventually became a very successful real estate manager and developer founding The Durst Organization in 1915. His father, Seymour, became head of the family business in 1974 upon Joseph's death. Douglas's mother died when he was a child, in a fall from the roof of the family's three-story house; the exact circumstances were never clarified. 

Douglas graduated from the Fieldston School in 1962 and the University of California at Berkeley in 1966. He attended New York University's Urban Studies program for two years and then joined the family business then run by his father and two uncles, Roy and David.

Career
Douglas took over the Durst Organization in 1992 upon his father's retirement. He presided over the development of several major buildings in New York City:
In 1999, the 48-story 4 Times Square;
In 2005, the 38-story Helena at 601 West 57th Street;
In 2007, the 57-story Epic on 125 West 31st Street;
In 2008, the 58-story Bank of America Tower at One Bryant Park;

Durst is a director of the Real Estate Board of New York. Durst is known for emphasizing density and sustainability in his projects.

New School University Center
Located on 14th Street and 5th Avenue in Manhattan, the New School university center was designed by Skidmore, Owings & Merrill and developed by The Durst Organization.  The building is designed to LEED Gold standards.

One World Trade Center development

In 2010, the Durst Organization bid on and won the right to invest $100 million in the One World Trade Center development becoming a co-developer with the Port Authority of New York and New Jersey.

The contract negotiated between the Port Authority and the Durst Organization specifies that the Durst Organization will receive a $15 million fee and a percentage of "base building changes that result in net economic benefit to the project." The specifics of the signed contract give Durst 75 percent of savings up to $24 million and stepping down thereafter (to 50 percent, 25 percent and 15 percent) as the savings increased. Durst had offered to work for a fixed $35 million fee, but the Port chose the incentive fee arrangement. Significant changes to the building have been made since his joining of the project.

Bank of America Tower – One Bryant Park
In May 2010, Douglas Durst, former Vice President Al Gore, and New York Mayor Michael Bloomberg officially opened the Bank of America Tower. It was the first high-rise commercial tower to receive LEED platinum rating in the United States. The 55 story, 2.1 million square foot building  located on the corner of Sixth Avenue and 42nd Street was designed by Cookfox Architects.

In June 2009, a group of banks provided Bank of America and Durst Organization $1.28 billion to refinance the building. Bank of America provided half of the loan. The other parts came from New York Mellon Corp., Wells Fargo, Westdeutsche Immobilien Bank, and Helaba Bank.

VIA 57 West
In the early 2000s, architect Bjarke Ingels met Durst when he was in Copenhagen with his wife, Susanne, a native of Denmark. He visited Ingels' studio in February 2010.

In spring 2010, Durst Fetner Residential commissioned Bjarke Ingels Group (BIG) to bring a new residential typology to Manhattan. In 2011, BIG opened an office in New York to supervise VIA's development and construction. Completed in 2016, VIA 57 West is a 709-unit, four sided, pyramid shaped tower of apartments on West Fifty-seventh Street.

Philanthropy and charitable activities
Durst is a director of The New School, The Trust for Public Land, Project for Public Spaces, and the Roundabout Theatre Company. He is a trustee of the Old York Foundation, which was established by his father, to help educate people about the history and ongoing problems of New York City. Durst is also a prominent environmentalist and operates one of the largest organic farms in New York State.

McEnroe Farm
In 1987, Durst purchased a piece of land from Ray McEnroe, the owner of an organic farm in Dutchess County, New York, some 100 miles north of Manhattan. He purchased the land to dispose of his horses' manure in an environmentally friendly way. Durst later partnered with McEnroe, and now the farm is 500 acres, and among the top 25% of organic farms in the United States.

Personal life
In 1967, he married Susanne Durst, a Danish national whom he met in Denmark after college.

Children
They have three children:
Anita Durst, the founder of Chashama, a charity dedicated to locating affordable or free studio and gallery space for artists in New York City. 
Alexander Durst, vice president at the Durst Organization responsible for development, project management, and operations. He is married to Eva Billeci, senior project manager at the Durst Organization.
Helena Rose Domino, vice president at the Durst Organization; she is also a board member of Just Food, Governors Island Alliance, the Manhattan Solid Waste Advisory Board as well as President of New York Water Taxi and Circle Line Downtown.

Health
Douglas Durst suffered a severe leg injury in 1972 when a coal-fired water heater exploded in a Newfoundland house where he was then living with his wife and young family. "I should've died there," Durst would later tell The New York Times. "It changed my whole outlook on life. I had to get more serious about what I was doing", he said, moving back to the family real estate business following months of recuperation. After suffering more than four decades of pain, despite many years of surgery, part of Durst's lower right leg was amputated in 2015. He walks today with the help of a prosthesis.

Robert Durst
Douglas and his brother Robert had a contentious childhood. As children, they were both put in therapy to help resolve their differences. When they became adults, both eventually worked in the family business. As oldest brother, Robert believed he would be the natural successor to his father as the leader of the Durst Organization. When their father Seymour chose Douglas over him in 1992, Robert estranged himself from his entire family and in 2006 sued for his share of the Durst family trust. A $65 million settlement was reached that divested Robert of all future share of the Durst family wealth. In 2001, Robert Durst was charged with murdering a neighbor and dismembering his body in Galveston, Texas. Pleading self-defense, he was acquitted of the murder charge. Douglas was interviewed by The New York Times in January 2015, and was quoted as saying about Robert: "There's no doubt in my mind that if he had the opportunity to kill me, he would."

Douglas Durst told The New York Times in December 2015 that he believed, until 2001, in his brother's innocence regarding Kathleen McCormack Durst's "disappearance" in 1982. Contrary to his brother's assertions to the documentary filmmakers of The Jinx, he was never privy to his father's meetings with a lawyer and private detective tasked with investigating Kathleen's disappearance. "I'm going to be a witness in Los Angeles" for the prosecution of his brother for the murder of Susan Berman, whom investigators believe Durst murdered because she knew details of Robert's role in his wife Kathleen's death, "so they don't want me to talk too much about anything after 2001", Douglas Durst said. On June 28, 2021, Douglas Durst appeared in court as a witness for the prosecution in the Susan Berman murder trial, saying he was not happy to testify against his brother and only appeared under threat of subpoena. He said Robert's wife Kathie told him she was going to seek a divorce from Robert. Robert told him and his wife Kathie vanished a couple of days after he put her on a train to New York City from their lakeside house in Westchester County, and that was the last time he saw her. "His tone was very neutral," Douglas Durst said. "There was no great anxiety in his tone. It seemed a little strange.” Douglas said growing up as children his brother Robert "Treated me miserably. He would fight with me at every chance. He would embarrass me." Douglas said Robert would "like to murder me”, and he had not spoken to Robert since 1999. Robert died in prison in January 2022.

References

1944 births
Living people
Jewish American philanthropists
People of Galician-Jewish descent
American real estate businesspeople
Businesspeople from New York City
University of California, Berkeley alumni
Douglas Durst
20th-century American businesspeople
Philanthropists from New York (state)
American amputees